Lago di Cei (Lach de Zéi in local dialect), is a lake in the comune of Villa Lagarina, not far from Rovereto in Trentino, northern Italy.

The whole basin in which the lake lies was once occupied by a single, larger lake. After the latter drained, two smaller lakes remained: the largest, having a surface of c. 4.5 hectares, receives the water of the other (called Lagabis), which has a semicircular shape a from which the Rio Arione outflows.

See also
Monte Bondone

External links
Page at the Villa Lagarine municipality website 

Lakes of Trentino-Alto Adige/Südtirol
Garda Mountains